Donovaly is a village in the Banská Bystrica Region of central Slovakia. Being situated in an important pass between the mountains of Veľká Fatra and Starohorské vrchy, on the route connecting Banská Bystrica with Ružomberok, it became a prominent centre of winter and summer sports.

History
Donovaly was founded in the early 17th century. During World War II, it became an important center of the anti-German Resistance.

Tourism
Donovaly is a part of Low Tatras National Park, and it hosts one of the biggest and most popular ski resorts in Slovakia. Elevation is between 910 – 1,402 m, and there are more than 11 km of ski slopes, 17 lifts and elevators. 
In 2006, the Telemix lift by POMA, France – the 3rd of this kind in the world – was installed.
It consists of 6 seated lift chairs, and 8 seated cabins, so the skiers can choose how they will go up to the top.
Winter season starts from end of November and lasts until late March, beginning of April. It is also renowned for its dogsled racing championships.

See also
 List of municipalities and towns in Slovakia

References

Genealogical resources

The records for genealogical research are available at the state archive "Statny Archiv in Banska Bystrica, Slovakia"

 Roman Catholic church records (births/marriages/deaths): 1797-1897 (parish A)

External links

Official website
Tourist information about Donovaly
Latest snow and ski conditions in Donovaly
Surnames of living people in Donovaly

Ski areas and resorts in Slovakia
Villages and municipalities in Banská Bystrica District